I'm a Celebrity is the seventh studio album by British pop group Right Said Fred. It yielded one single: "I'm a Celebrity". An exposé of celebrity life, it has gained airplay in both the United States and United Kingdom.

Track listing
"I'm a Celebrity"
"Melanie"
"I Am a Bachelor"
"Sex Is the Common Ground"
"Why Do I?"
"Lord Have Mercy"
"This Love"
"You Ain't Seen Nothing Yet"
"Without Thinking"
"Yellow Metal Car"
"Infected"
"Cherry Cherry"
"I'm Too Sexy" (Remix)

2008 albums
Right Said Fred albums